Sofia Stanislavovna Pozdniakova (born 17 June 1997) is a Russian right-handed sabre fencer, 2019 team world champion, 2018 individual world champion, 2021 team Olympic champion, and 2021 individual Olympic champion.

Early life
Pozdniakova was born in Novosibirsk, where she was coached by Sergey Stepankin at the Fencing Center. Both of her parents were fencers: her father, Stanislav Pozdnyakov, is a 4-time Olympic champion, 10-time World champion and 13-time European champion in the sabre competition, as well as the President of the Russian Olympic Committee (since 2018), and her mother, Anastasia, is Master of Sports and secretary at the Fencing Federation of the Novosibirsk Oblast. She decided to follow in her parents' footsteps at the age of 10, deciding to abandon swimming and acrobatic gymnastics.

Medal Record

Olympic Games

World Championship

European Championship

Grand Prix

World Cup

Personal life

Pozdiakova studied at the Smolensk State Academy of Physical Culture, Sports and Tourism, and as of 2018 she planned to become a sports journalist in future. Since 2016, she participates for CSKA Moscow.

Since September 2020, Pozdiakova is married to Saratov-based fencer Konstantin Lokhanov.

References

External links

1997 births
Living people
Russian female sabre fencers
Sportspeople from Novosibirsk
Fencers at the 2020 Summer Olympics
Olympic fencers of Russia
Olympic medalists in fencing
Medalists at the 2020 Summer Olympics
Olympic gold medalists for the Russian Olympic Committee athletes